Chinese Taipei School Kuala Lumpur (CTSKL,  - Former Chinese name) is a Taiwanese (Republic of China) international school in Shah Alam, Selangor, Malaysia.

It was established on 13 April 1992, and includes dormitory facilities. The school provides English and Malay classes.

It serves levels kindergarten through senior high school.

As of 2016 it has 35 teachers, 115 ROC national students, and 135 students of other nationalities.

See also

 Malaysia–Taiwan relations
 List of schools in Selangor

References

External links
 Chinese Taipei School Kuala Lumpur 

International schools in Selangor
Shah Alam
Taiwanese international schools in Malaysia
1992 establishments in Malaysia
Educational institutions established in 1992
Malaysia–Taiwan relations